Edgett is a surname. Notable people with the surname include:

Charles Edgar Edgett (1881–1947), Canadian police officer
Isaac H. Edgett (1838–1917), American civil servant and politician